Calliostoma chuni is a species of sea snail, a marine gastropod mollusk in the family Calliostomatidae.

Description
The height of the shell attains 31 mm.

Distribution
This species occurs in the Indian Ocean off Somalia at a depth of 800 m.

References

External links
 Carl Chun, Wissenschaftliche Ergebnisse der Deutschen Tiefsee-Expedition 1898-1899; Jena, 1904

Endemic fauna of Somalia
chuni
Gastropods described in 1903